Paul Davies (born 1946) is a British physicist.

Paul Davies may also refer to:

Sports
Paul Davies (footballer, born 1952), Welsh footballer
Paul Davies (footballer, born 1960), English footballer
Paul Davies (wheelchair rugby), British wheelchair rugby player and manager
Paul Davies (table tennis) (born 1966), Welsh table tennis player
Paul Davies (snooker player) (born 1970), Welsh snooker player

Art
Paul Davies (artist) (born 1979), Australian artist
Paul Davies (art historian) (born 1955), professor of history of art

Other
Paul L. Davies (born 1944), British legal scholar
Paul Davies (politician) (born 1969), Welsh politician, Leader of the Opposition in the Senedd and former Leader of the Welsh Conservatives 
Paul Davies (priest) (born 1973), Archdeacon of Bangor
Paul B. Davies, British actor and writer
Paul Stuart Davies (born 1982), British singer and songwriter
Paul S Davies, UK barrister and legal academic
Paul Davies (writer) (born 1949), Australian television script writer, novelist and playwright

See also
Paul Davis (disambiguation)